Lou Hamou-Lhadj is an American director, animator and writer at Pixar. He is best known for his work on film Borrowed Time, which together with Andrew Coats, he directed, wrote and released independently through Quorum Films, LLC. Hamou-Lhadj is nominated for the Academy Award for Best Animated Short Film at 89th Academy Awards, that he shares with Andrew Coats.

Filmography

Awards and nominations

References

External links
 

Living people
American animators
American producers
American directors
American animated film directors
American animated film producers
Year of birth missing (living people)